Tenaha is a town in Shelby County, Texas, United States. The population was 989 at the 2020 census.

History
Tenaha was established on February 2, 1886.  The community was named by members of the Hicks family (Cherokee) for Tenehaw Municipality, from the Spanish, the original name of Shelby County.

In 2009, Tenaha became a defendant in a class action lawsuit over allegations that local police regularly made improper seizures of cash, jewelry, and property from African-American and Latino motorists passing through the town. Arrested drivers were given a choice of either going to jail on money-laundering felony charges or handing over all their valuables in order to be allowed to walk free. In one case a couple surrendered $6,000 to keep their children out of child protection services.  In addition to taking of valuables from motorists who were not criminally charged, Tenaha officials allegedly agreed to lenient sentences for known drug traffickers in exchange for cash forfeitures. See Asset forfeiture controversy section below for more details.

Geography

Tenaha is located at  (31.944062, –94.246274). It is located on a junction of  U.S. Routes 59, 84 and 96.

According to the United States Census Bureau, the town has a total area of 4.0  square miles (10.3 km2), of which 4.0  square miles (10.2 km2) is land and 0.04  square miles (0.1 km2) (0.50%) is water.

Demographics

As of the 2020 United States census, there were 989 people, 559 households, and 394 families residing in the town.

As of the census of 2010, there were 1,160 people, 422 households, and 287 families residing in the town. The population density was 268.4 people per square mile (103.6/km2). There were 475 housing units at an average density of 122.3 per square mile (47.2/km2). The racial and ethnic makeup of the town was 37.6% non-Hispanic African American, 36.6% non-Hispanic White, 24.0% Hispanic or Latino of any race, and 1.9% other.

Of the 422 households, 36.0% had children under the age of 18 living with them, 41.2% were married couples living together, 20.6% had a female householder with no husband present, and 32.0% were non-families. 26.3% of all households were made up of individuals living alone; 12.3% had someone living alone who was 65 years of age or older. The average household size was 2.75 and the average family size was 3.33.

In the town, the population was spread out, with 32.2% under the age of 18, 8.7% from 18 to 24, 26.7% from 25 to 44, 20.7% from 45 to 64, and 11.8% who were 65 years of age or older. The median age was 32 years. For every 100 females, there were 85.5 males. For every 100 females age 18 and over, there were 80.4 males.

The median income for a household in the town was $23,750, and mean household income was $31,055. Median family income was $26,154, and mean family income was $32,600. The town's per capita income was $11,600. About 33.6% of families and 35.9% of the population were below the poverty line, including 46.4% of those under age 18 and 30.4% of those aged 65 or over.

Police department

Asset forfeiture controversy 

Between 2006 and 2008, Tenaha Marshal’s Office used state forfeiture regulations to seize property from nearly 200 motorists. In about 50 of the cases, suspects were charged with drug possession. But in 147 incidents, marshals seized cash, jewelry, cell phones and automobiles even though no contraband was found and the motorist was not charged with any crime. 
 Many of these were African-American or Latino drivers. At least 150 motorists had property seized by Tenaha marshal’s office, totaling more than US$3 million.

Examples of seizures from non-whites included:
A mixed-race family of four traveling through Tenaha were pulled over by marshals for a moving violation. Officers found no contraband but seized $6,037 after a search. The marshals and the district attorney threatened to take the two children away from the parents and place them in Child Protective Services if they refused to hand over the cash. Tenaha marshals eventually returned the family's money without an apology. The parents are now plaintiffs in a federal class action lawsuit.
Linda Dorman, a great-grandmother from Akron, Ohio had $4,000 in cash taken from her by local authorities when she was stopped while driving through town after visiting Houston in April 2007. Court records make no mention that anything illegal was found in her van. Dorman still hopes for the return of what she calls her life savings.
Javier Flores and William Parsons were traveling through Tenaha on July 22, 2008 when they were stopped by police for speeding. Both men were arrested, and $8,400 was seized, after a police dog allegedly detected drugs in the vehicle although no contraband was found. The pair were then threatened with money laundering charges unless they forfeited the money. Both men were then released from custody without charge.
 Two men had $50,000 seized even though court records show there was no evidence to indicate the cash was related in any way to criminal enterprise or that the men were engaged in any illegal activity.

The town used the proceeds from the seizures to build a new marshals office and personally reward high-revenue generating officers.  Other purchases included a $524 popcorn machine and $195 for candy.  Donations to Little League teams and local chambers of commerce were also made using seized funds. Texas law states that forfeited money can only be used for official purposes by district attorney offices, and for law-enforcement purposes by police departments.  Lynda Russell, Tenaha's district attorney, has denied any impropriety. However, the US Attorney for the Eastern District of Texas re-prosecuted drug offenders after officials in Tenaha and Shelby County gave known traffickers lenient sentences in exchange for cash forfeitures. In 2008, Shelby county was investigated by the Department of Justice's civil rights division over an allegation made by its former auditor that seized funds had been used for campaign materials in local elections.

Class action lawsuit 
In July 2008, 10 plaintiffs filed suit in federal court against Tenaha and Shelby county officials, alleging that police officers had stopped them without cause and unjustly seized their property. The plaintiffs allege that officers threatened them with criminal prosecution if they did not cooperate. Officials named in the suit included Tenaha mayor George Bowers, deputy city marshal Barry Washington and Shelby County district attorney Lynda Kay Russell.   Texas State Senator John Whitmire stated, "If used properly, it's a good law-enforcement tool to see that crime doesn't pay.  But in this instance, where people are being pulled over and their property is taken with no charges filed and no convictions, I think that's theft."

By March 2009, the plaintiff's attorney Timothy Garrigan was seeking class-action status for the lawsuit, citing many similar reports from other alleged victims. In response the Tenaha marshals said that would return at least one man's seized possessions, valued at around $8,500. In August 2011, a judge agreed the case could move forward as a class action because it was part of a larger legal battle "to stop illegal search and seizures and questionable 'interdiction' programs".

In late 2012, the ACLU announced a settlement in the case, under which police must now observe rigorous rules during traffic stops in Tenaha and Shelby County: traffic stops will be videotaped, and the officer must give reason for the stop and for suspicion of criminal activity. Drivers are to be advised that they can refuse a search, and dogs will no longer be used in conducting traffic stops. Property determined to have been taken improperly must be returned within 30 business days. Also, asset forfeiture revenue  from traffic stops must be donated to non-profit organizations, or used to pay for the officer training required by the settlement.

Education
Public education in the town of Tenaha is provided by the Tenaha Independent School District. The best known alumnus of Tenaha High School is Jim Wilkinson (James R. Wilkinson), who gave up plans to become an undertaker to go to work for Republican Congressman Dick Armey in 1992. He served as General Tommy R. Franks' director of strategic communications, and is deputy national security advisor for communications as of December 2003.

Media
The Light and Champion, a news and information company, marked its 140th year of operation in 2017. It serves Shelby County, as well as Logansport, Louisiana. The Light and Champion produces a weekly print edition, a weekly free-distribution print product called The Merchandiser, operates a web site, www.lightandchampion.com, and a Facebook page. The Light and Champion is owned by Moser Community Media, based in Brenham, Texas.

Notable people

 Bobo Barnett, a circus clown whose career lasted from the late 1920s to the early 1970s
 Wayne Christian, Republican state representative from Shelby and neighboring counties, was raised in Tenaha and graduated from Tenaha High School in 1969
 George Peddy, State representative from Shelby County

See also

 Civil forfeiture in the United States

References

Towns in Shelby County, Texas
Towns in Texas